"Little White Lies" is a single released by the British Rock band Status Quo in 1999. It was included on the album Under the Influence.

Track listing

CD1
 "Little White Lies" (Edit) (Parfitt) (3.50)
 "I Knew The Bride" (N Lowe) (3.30)
 "Pictures Of Matchstick Men" (1999) (Rossi) (3.21)

CD2
 "Little White Lies" (Parfitt) (4.15)
 "Pictures Of Matchstick Men" (1999) (Rossi) (3.21)
 "Driving to Glory" (Parfitt/Edwards) (3.42)

Charts

References

Status Quo (band) songs
1999 singles
Songs written by Rick Parfitt
1999 songs